Central Mahallu Juma Masjid is a Juma Masjid in Muvattupuzha, Kerala, India. The CMJ aims at purging poverty, diseases and assists poor and helpless people. The CMJ's goals are eradicating unemployment, instituting educational reforms, and leading Islamic society in the path of glory. The CMJ mainly focuses on social and welfare activities.

Membership
According to 2011–2021 censuses, the Mahal consists of 11 blocks which includes 1824 families and about total 8960 members (4594 men and 4366 women). All the Mahallu members are well cooperate in the development and welfare activities of Mahallu.

The masjid is located at Kavumkara market in Muvattupuzha.

History

Central Mahallu Jama'ath dates to the early 1900s. In 1927, the land for the Juma Masjid was purchased. It was established on 19 February 1927 (27 Sha'aban 1346), the date of the first Jumu'ah Namaz held there.

References

External links

 Official Facebook page

Mosques in Kerala
Mosques completed in 1927
Religious buildings and structures in Ernakulam district